Ainsworth House may refer to:

 Lewis Ainsworth House, Orange, California, listed on the National Register of Historic Places (NRHP) in Orange County
 William W. and Elizabeth J. Ainsworth House, Des Moines, Iowa, NRHP-listed in Polk County
 Ainsworth House (Thompson Falls, Montana), NRHP-listed in Sanders County
 Capt. John C. Ainsworth House, Oregon City, Oregon, NRHP-listed in Clackamas County
 Maud and Belle Ainsworth House, Portland, Oregon, NRHP-listed
 Oliver N. Ainsworth House, Spearfish, South Dakota, NRHP-listed in Lawrence County
 Ainsworth House (Big Trails, Wyoming), NRHP-listed in Washakie County

See also
 Boatman-Ainsworth House, Lakewood, Washington, a NRHP-listed in Pierce County